The Payoff may refer to:

 The Pay-Off (1930 film)
 The Pay-Off (1926 film)
The Payoff (1935 film), an American crime/drama/romance film
The Payoff (1942 film), an American crime mystery film
La mazzetta, a 1978 Italian comedy-crime movie also known as The Payoff
"The Payoff" (song), a 2010 single by Canadian rock band Faber Drive

See also 
 Payoff (disambiguation)